is a passenger railway station located in Izumi-ku, Yokohama, Japan, operated by the private railway operator Sagami Railway (Sotetsu).

Lines 
Izumino Station is served by the Sagami Railway Izumino Line, and lies 6.0 kilometers from the starting point of the line at Futamatagawa Station.

Station layout
The station consists of two island platforms serving four tracks, with an elevated station building built over the platforms and tracks.

Platforms

 Platforms 1 and 4 are normally used by Rapid services.

Adjacent stations

History 
Izumino Station opened on April 8, 1976 as the terminus of the Izumino Line.

Passenger statistics
In fiscal 2019, the station was used by an average of 13,753 passengers daily.

The passenger figures for previous years are as shown below.

Surrounding area

See also
 List of railway stations in Japan

References

External links 

 Official home page  

Railway stations in Kanagawa Prefecture
Railway stations in Japan opened in 1976
Railway stations in Yokohama